Narten present is a proposed inflectional class of the Proto-Indo-European verb, named after the Indo-Iranianist Johanna Narten who posited its existence in 1968. It is characterized by accent on the root in all of the person-number forms.

Roots having Narten presents always possess a surface accent, having a lengthened grade R(ḗ) in the singular active, and a full-grade R(é) in the rest of the active forms, as well as the mediopassive. The proposed examples of roots having such acrostatic presents include the following:

These forms are best reflected in Indo-Iranian and Hittite, with relics surviving in other languages, particularly in the root "to eat".

Narten roots
In 1994 Jochem Schindler suggested the existence of what is called Narten roots – roots exhibiting a systematic *R(ḗ) ~ *R(é) ablaut in both nominal and verbal derivations, as opposed to the more common R(e) ~ R(Ø) pattern. These roots always carried a surface accent, and such ablaut is called more generally Narten ablaut. The other roots would then be non-Narten roots, exhibiting the R(e) ~ R(Ø) ablaut and allowing the accent to move away from the root.

It has been shown that verbal roots exhibiting Narten ablaut occur in the same morphophonological environments as the roots with mobile accentuation and, furthermore, that nominal stems exhibiting acrostatic Narten ablaut *R(ḗ) ~ *R(é) occur in the same morphophonological environments as roots undergoing the more usual R(ó) ~ R(é) type.

This insight has led to the development of modern theories regarding the relation of PIE accent, ablaut and the resulting ablaut classes: all roots, suffixes and inflectional endings (desinences) can be inherently "accented" or not, and the surfacing stress (i.e. the accent of the PIE word) falls on only one syllable, depending on the interplay of underlying accentuation of the combining morphemes.

Internal reconstruction
Narten-type ablaut with a lengthened-grade singular and a full grade elsewhere is speculated to have been the original form of the Proto-Indo-European s-aorist, which had the root in the lengthened e-grade in Indo-Iranian, Italic and Slavic, but in the full-grade in Greek and the Indo-Iranian middle.

Proto-Indo-European long-vowel preterites with */ē/ in the root are according to some originally imperfects of Narten presents, which explains the lengthened grade.

Acceptance and criticism
The existence of Narten roots has been disputed in recent years. According to  the lengthened grade stem in the singular was formed complementary to root aorist, replacing the secondary endings by primary endings and changing the ablaut vowel.  analyzes the evidence collected by Schindler and Narten on acrostatic inflection in Avestan and PIE and concludes that "the concept of 'Narten' roots can be abandoned altogether.". On the other hand, Lexikon der indogermanischen Verben classifies Narten roots under the type (1b) "acrodynamic present", reconstructing in total 52 PIE roots belonging to this inflectional class, of which 32 are marked as "certain" and 20 as "uncertain".

Notes

References

Proto-Indo-European language